Events in the year 1873 in Portugal.

Incumbents
Monarch: Louis I
Prime Minister: Fontes Pereira de Melo

Events

Arts and entertainment

Sports

Births

31 July – Domingos Oliveira, politician, military officer (died 1957)

Deaths

Full date missing
Amélie of Leuchtenberg, Empress of Brazil, died in Lisbon (born 1812).

References

 
Years of the 19th century in Portugal
Portugal